The Ontario Disability Support Program (ODSP) is a means-tested government-funded 
last resort income support paid for qualifying residents in the province of Ontario, Canada, who are above the age of 18 and have a disability.  ODSP and Ontario Works (OW) are the two main components of Ontario's social assistance system.  Like most social programs in Canada, the program is funded by the government of the province.  The Ministry of Community and Social Services is responsible for ODSP and OW.

This is unlike Social Security Disability in the United States which is a federally funded program under the umbrella of an Old Age Pension but provides similar benefits—regardless of the state of residence.

The ODSP is defined by provincial legislation, the ODSP Act, and its supporting regulations.  It is managed through policy directives.

Unlike Ontario Works, ODSP does not require recipients to undertake employment-related activities like job searching, or vocational training.  This is determined through a subjective evaluation of four criteria that are defined within the ODSP Act:

  The disability is continuous or recurrent;
  It is expected to last for a year or more;
  The disability significantly limits their ability to work, look after themselves, or get out in the community; and 
  It has been verified by an approved health professional.

For recipients wishing to work, an optional component provides employment support funding, such as referral to a specialized employment counsellor.

ODSP is meant to replace the income lost due to the recipient's disability making them unable to work enough to gain self-sufficiency and thus has a higher rate of assistance and asset limits than Ontario Works does.

Verification process
The Disability Determination Package is used to collect information about the disability.

The two main parts of the Disability Determination Package must be completed by an approved healthcare professional. These parts are:

Health Status Report - collects information about the applicant's medical condition, its impairments, restrictions and expected duration, as well as treatments
Activities of Daily Living Index - collects information about the impact of impairment on the ability to work, care for self and participation in the community
Healthcare professionals who are approved to complete both the Health Status Report and Activities of Daily Living Index:

  ophthalmologists
  optometrists
  physicians
  psychological associates
  psychologists
  registered nurses in the extended class

Healthcare professionals who are approved to complete the Activities of Daily Living Index only:
  audiologists
  chiropractors
  occupational therapists
  physiotherapists
  registered nurses
  social workers
  speech-language pathologists

Benefits

The program is paid monthly to a "benefit unit" which can consist of a single person between 18 and 65 (or a senior citizen who is ineligible for Old Age Security or Canada Pension Plan) and any others who may require the person's support. This can be any corresponding dependent adults who do not qualify for assistance (though they are subject to workfare requirements), children under the individual's care, or a spouse. The ODSP benefit has two main components: a fixed basic needs allowance, and an amount for housing that is variable. For those who do not have independent cooking facilities and/or cannot provide grocery receipts, a "Board and Lodging" amount is provided instead. All costs are verified through submitted receipts and information sharing among other government agencies.

In addition to employment supports and financial assistance, the ODSP provides health-related benefits to assist recipients with their medical needs. These include:

 Prescription medication coverage (for medications listed on the Ontario Drug Benefit formulary) - a co-payment may apply 
Dental coverage
Vision care (including assistance with the purchase of eyeglasses)
Medical transportation assistance (verified as medically necessary by a doctor)
Nutritional assistance for pregnant and breastfeeding women.
Coverage for medical supplies related to a recipient's disability
Transitional coverage for those who no longer meet financial eligibility or move on to full-time work. 
Financial assistance to help recipients and their families with essential living expenses
Help to find and to keep a job, and advancing a career

See also

Assured Income for the Severely Handicapped
 National Disability Insurance Scheme (Australia)

References

External links
 ODSP Legal Guide

Health in Ontario
Government of Ontario
Disability organizations based in Canada
Social security in Canada